The 2006 Zenit St.Petersburg season was the club's twelfth season in the Russian Premier League, the highest tier of association football in Russia.

Season events
On 26 June, Dick Advocaat was appointed as Zenit's new manager.

Squad

Transfers

In

Loans in

Out

Loans out

Released

Competitions

Overall record

UEFA Cup

Qualifying rounds

Premier League

Results by round

Results

Table

Russian Cup

2005/06

2006/07

Round 16 took place during the 2007 season.

Squad statistics

Appearances and goals

|-
|colspan="14"|Players who away on loan:

|-
|colspan="14"|Players who left Zenit during the season:

|}

Goal Scorers

Clean sheets

Disciplinary record

References

FC Zenit Saint Petersburg seasons
Zenit St.Petersburg